The discography of Australian rock band The Whitlams, consists of six studio albums, two live albums, two compilation album, and nineteen singles.

Albums

Studio albums

Live albums

Compilation albums

Video albums

Singles

Videography

Music videos

References

Discographies of Australian artists
Rock music group discographies
Alternative rock discographies